Online to offline, commonly abbreviated to O2O, is a phrase that is used in digital marketing to describe systems enticing consumers within a digital environment to make purchases of goods or services from physical businesses.

What's O2O 

O2O means "Online To Offline" but also "Offline to Online", indicating the two-way flow between the online and the physical world, especially retail and ecommerce, but also between brand marketing and shopper or point-of-sale marketing efforts to influence purchase decisions.  For example, consumers could see an ad online and be driven to visit the store, or be in a physical store but ultimately purchase online for a variety of reasons (selection, price, convenience, etc).  There are many aspects to O2O, and businesses are increasingly challenged to satisfy consumers' expectations of a frictionless flow. 

Initially, the term was applied to QR code marketing efforts, but has since evolved.  It is often confused with omni-channel, which refers to companies with an online store as well as physical retail locations.

Often, O2O implies an online trigger which prompts the customer to go to a physical location to complete their purchase, but it can also be the other way around: One aspect of newer O2O initiatives is the ability to pay online and then pick up a product in an offline place, such as the retailers' physical store or 3rd party locations.  Another O2O feature is returning items purchased online to the retailers' offline location.

In the startup world, we are used to hearing about "Offline to Online" strategies as investors do not usually adhere to any other business models such as Online to Offline.

Criticism 
In its early use, the phrase received criticism as illogical. However, its mass adoption has dulled much of this criticism.

New Reality since March 2020 
The new reality that forced users around the world to adopt this model. Here are industries that adopted this new way of thinking
 Print on demand
 3D printing

See also 
 Digital marketing system
 Mobile marketing
 Online advertising
 Consumer-to-business
 Production to consumer
 Customer to customer
 Business-to-business
 Phygital
 user experience

References 

Digital marketing